is an anime series based on the manga series of the same name by Tamiki Wakaki serialized in Weekly Shōnen Sunday magazine. The anime is produced by Manglobe, directed by Shigehito Takayanagi, series composition by Hideyuki Kurata, character design by Akio Watanabe, art direction by Ayumi Satō and Kayoko Tokō and sound directed by Yoshikazu Iwanami. The first season aired from October 6, 2010 to December 22, 2010 on TV Tokyo, TV Hokkaido and TV Setouchi and on later dates on TV Aichi, TV Osaka and TVQ Kyushu. A second season titled The World God Only Knows II aired from April 11, 2011 to June 28, 2011. A third season, titled , aired from July 8, 2013 to September 23, 2013.

One day, out of pride, he accidentally accepts what he assumes to be a challenge for a Bishōjo game when in reality he has accepted a contract from a bumbling demoness named Elsie who asks for his help in capturing runaway spirits from Hell who are hiding in the hearts of girls. The only way to force the spirits out of the girls hearts is by replacing the spirits in the girls' hearts with himself (metaphorically speaking) by making the girls fall in love with him, much to Keima's horror. With the threat of death for both of them should he refuse, Keima has no choice but to help Elsie. Together with his intelligence and knowledge of the dating sim genre and Elsie's magical powers, Keima is about to embark on his greatest challenge.

An OVA episode, titled , was released with the limited edition of the 14th manga volume on September 16, 2011. It is based on chapters 54–55 of the manga, in which Chihiro Kosaka forms a band called the "2B Pencils".

A two-episode OVA, based on the character Tenri Ayukawa and titled , was released together with the limited editions of the 19th and 20th manga volumes on October 16, 2012, and December 18, 2012, respectively.

A fourth OVA episode, featuring the character Kanon Nagakawa becoming a magical girl and titled  was released together with the limited edition of the 22nd manga volume on June 18, 2013.

Series Overview

Episode list

The World God Only Knows (2010)

The World God Only Knows II (2011)

The World God Only Knows: Goddesses (2013)

OVAs

Notes

References
General
 
 

Specific

External links
 The World God Only Knows official website 
 The World God Only Knows anime at TV Tokyo 
 

Lists of anime episodes
The World God Only Knows